Nizhnezavitinka is a rural locality (a selo) in Korshunovsky Selsoviet of Mikhaylovsky District, Amur Oblast, Russia. The population was 54 as of 2018.

Geography 
The village is located on the right bank of the Zavitaya River, 28 km north from Poyarkovo.

References 

Rural localities in Mikhaylovsky District, Amur Oblast